Zsófia Varga (born January 15, 1989) is a Hungarian basketball player for UNI Győr and the Hungarian national team.

She participated at the EuroBasket Women 2017.

References

1989 births
Living people
Hungarian women's basketball players
People from Ajka
Small forwards
Sportspeople from Veszprém County